Dean Allmark (born 25 August 1983), is an English professional wrestler. He is best known for his time in All Star Wrestling and his appearance in Total Nonstop Action Wrestling and a performance in Pro Wresting Live (PWL). Allmark, who often goes by the nicknames "Xtreme", or "2-Xtreme", is one half of the UK Dream Team with Kid Cool.

Career
Allmark began his wrestling career in the Stoke-on-Trent based wrestling promotion Great British Hardcore (GBH) in 1999, where he was trained in its training school by Keith Myatt and Chris Curtis. He had his first professional match in January 2000 at Longton WMC against Chris Curtis. During Allmark's time in GBH, he won the British tag team titles twice, once with fellow trainee Timm Wiley and once with Robbie Dynamite. After this Allmark moved to Brian Dixon's All Star Wrestling. In 2001, Allmark became part of All Star's roster and found new tag team partners with Robbie Dynamite and Kid Cool. Teaming with Kid Cool became a lasting partnership as the pair became known as the UK Dream Team. Dynamite's partnership with Allmark was less successful with both men beginning a long-standing personal feud. On 7 April 2004, Allmark made his biggest appearance outside the UK when he was chosen to be a part of Team Britain during Total Nonstop Action Wrestling's America's X-Cup. During the PPV from Nashville, Tennessee, Allmark failed to win his singles match against Team Mexico's Mr. Águila but picked up a win in a tag match against Heavy Metal and Abismo Negro when Allmark's tag partner James Mason made one of the opponents submit. Team Mexico eventually won America's X-Cup. Back in England on 7 June 2005, the UK Dream Team defeated "The Chippendales", Mikey Whiplash (Michael Gilbert) and Johnny Midnight, to be recognized by All Star Promotions as the British Tag Team Champions. Allmark went on to renew his feud with Robbie Dynamite and after months of rapidly intensifying rivalry, things came to a head when Allmark defeated Dynamite in January 2006 for his All Star British Mid-Heavyweight title, making Allmark a double champion in the promotion. Dynamite fought back though (with the aid of "Chippendale" Mikey Whiplash) and defeated the UK Dream Team on 25 February 2006 in Staffordshire to win the British Tag Team titles. Allmark was hospitalised after the match with a gash to the head that needed nine stitches. Allmark commented on the situation between him and Dynamite on All Star's website writing;

Allmark tried to return to action in March 2006 only for the wound to re-open. He had to go back to hospital for more treatment. It was later announced that Dynamite and Allmark would meet in a no-holds-barred match on 18 March at the Victoria Hall in Hanley. However, this match never took place because only hours before the event Allmark received news that his 18-month-old son had been taken ill. The two rivals repeatedly met in matches throughout the rest of 2006, many of which were for Allmark's Mid-Heavyweight title. Dynamite finally defeated Allmark for the title in 2007. In 2006, Allmark became the head trainer at the All Star Wrestling school. On 1 September 2010, Allmark wrestled for Dragon Gate Pro Wrestling in St. Ives (DG:UK "Invasion 2"). There he defeated fellow British wrestler Stixx with a Spanish Fly Shiranui Kai. On 10 July 2010, Allmark wrestled for IPW:UK's Summer Sizzler which in Sittingbourne to compete in the quarter final of the IPW:UK Cruiserweight Championship Tournament. He went on to defeat Max Angleus with a single man Spanish Fly but mainly known as a Shiranui Kai. Allmark is now in the semifinals of the tournament which should be held at the next IPW:UK show. On 3 December 2011, Allmark made his debut for PCW - Preston City Wrestling, taking on the former UKFF number one, Dave Mastiff. This show also featured Desmond Wolfe's return to a UK ring. Allmark next appeared for PCW on 24 February, taking part in a 4-way Cruiserweight match against Noam Dar, Joey Hayes and Zack Sabre Jr. On 20 February 2013 Dean won a rumble match. His reward was to choose a partner on 10 April 2013 to face Robbie Dynamite and Rampage Brown in the first ever cage match in Gravesend. They won the match. Through ASW's relationship with Wrestle-1, Allmark made his debut for the Japanese promotion on 6 July 2014, losing the British Light Heavyweight Championship to Seiki Yoshioka. He regained the title from Yoshioka back in the United Kingdom on 19 August. On 19 December 2021, after a brief time away from wrestling, he had a 30-minute two falls to finish VS Mad Dog Maxx at Pro Wrestling Live. Neither wrestler could get that second pinfall. However, the two men agreed to have a rematch, with no malicious feelings between the two.

On January 22, 2023 - on Allmark’s 23rd wrestling anniversary, he announced his intention to hang up his wrestling boots in 2025 - culminating with an anniversary show   “25” on 25/01/25.

Personal life
Allmark is married to All Star promoter Brian Dixon's daughter Laetitia who works as an MC for the promotion.  The couple have two children.  In July 2022 it was announced that their elder son Joseph, already a referee, would be taking over road managerial duties for All Star from his grandfather Dixon who would continue running the company in a "back seat" capacity from its Birkenhead office.

Championships and accomplishments
All Star Wrestling
ASW Superslam British Heavyweight Championship (1 time)
British Light Heavyweight Championship (2 times, current)
British Mid-Heavyweight Championship (3 times)
British Open Tag Team Championship (1 time) - with Kid Cool
Wrestler of the Year (2006, 2008, 2009)
Great British Hardcore
GBH Catchweight Championship (1 time)
GBH Tag Team Championship (2 times) - with Timm Wylie & Robbie Dynamite
 Preston City Wrestling
 PCW Heavyweight Championship (1 time)
 PCW Cruiserweight Championship (1 time)
PCW Road to Glory (2018)

References

External links
 "Xtreme" Dean Allmark's Cagematch profile
 "Xtreme" Dean Allmark's All Star Wrestling profile (Archived)

1983 births
English male professional wrestlers
Living people
Sportspeople from Stoke-on-Trent
21st-century professional wrestlers